The Tănase is a left tributary of the river Bistrița in Romania. It flows into the Bistrița near Livezile.

References

Rivers of Romania
Rivers of Bistrița-Năsăud County